Thomas Johnsson (born 8 December 1949) is a Swedish former breaststroke swimmer. He competed in three events at the 1968 Summer Olympics.

References

External links
 

1949 births
Living people
Swedish male breaststroke swimmers
Olympic swimmers of Sweden
Swimmers at the 1968 Summer Olympics
Sportspeople from Västra Götaland County